Latchford railway station was a station in Latchford, Cheshire, England. The first station at Latchford was called Latchford and Grappenhall Road and opened in 1853; this was renamed Latchford in June 1854 but it closed in 1893, when a new alignment was opened in connection with the construction of the Manchester Ship Canal, and a new Latchford station was opened nearby. This closed to passengers on 10 September 1962. The station was on the
LNWR's Ditton Junction to Skelton Junction line and was used by Ditton Junction–Manchester and Liverpool–Manchester through trains.

References

External links
 Latchford station at Disused Stations

Disused railway stations in Warrington
Former London and North Western Railway stations
Railway stations in Great Britain opened in 1853
Railway stations in Great Britain closed in 1893
Railway stations in Great Britain opened in 1893
Railway stations in Great Britain closed in 1962